Odus may refer to:

Odus (fly), a genus of flies
Odus Creamer Horney (1866–1957), U.S. Army brigadier general
Odus Mitchell (1899–1989), American football player and coach
Odus, a fictional owl in Candy Crush Saga

See also 
 ODU (disambiguation)
 Odu (disambiguation)